Rowland's Castle is a village and civil parish in the East Hampshire district of Hampshire, England. It is 2.9 miles (4.7 km) north of Havant, on the Hampshire/West Sussex border.

The focal point of the village is the village green which is shaped somewhat like a lung.

The village takes its name from a motte-and-bailey castle, the remains of which are situated to the south of Redhill Road and west of the railway line, east of the current centre of the village.

History
Evidence the Romans made pottery, brick and tiles in the Rowland's Castle vicinity has been uncovered, and this would have been aided due to the availability of suitable clay. The castle was built at some time between 1066 and 1199 and is first documented under the name ROLOKECASTEL in 1381.

It was in good repair in the twelfth century, when Henry II spent several days there in hunting and amusement, but was abandoned by the 15th century. The site was damaged by the railway and quarrying in the 19th century, and now only the earthworks and a few small areas of wall remain.

Governance
Rowland's Castle is a ward and a parish council area within the East Hampshire local government district.  It is also part of the East Hampshire UK Parliament constituency.

Geography

The village lies in the area of the former Forest of Bere on the eastern boundary of Hampshire. To the east in the parish of Stoughton is Stansted Park.

Rowland's Castle lies on the northern edge of the Neogene deposits of the Hampshire Basin. The north of the village lies on the chalk of the southern South Downs. In the south is the Reading Formation which gave rise to the former local brick industry.

Economy
It is largely a quiet residential village, with four pubs and a few small shops, including a hardware store and a local convenience store.

Culture and community
Rowlands Castle Association

The Rowlands Castle Association has its own website at https://www.rowlandscastle.com.

Rowlands Castle Heritage Centre

A model railway depicting the village during the war has been created and is on display at nearby Stansted House.

Transport
Rowland's Castle is served by Rowlands Castle railway station on the Portsmouth Direct Line between London Waterloo and Portsmouth served by the generally hourly stopping service. There is just one significant bus route which operates every two hours during core daytime and goes via Leigh Park, Havant and Denvilles to Emsworth.

The village is crossed by several long-distance footpaths: the Monarch's Way, Sussex Border Path, Staunton Way and Shipwrights Way.  National Cycle Route 22 passes by the village green on its route from Havant to Petersfield.

Religious sites

St John the Baptist
The Church of England parish church of St John the Baptist is situated to the west of the centre of the village close to the B2149 road.  It is an aisled church with transept and chapels with the east window being a stained-glass depiction of the Crucifixion by Francis Austin.

Church on the Green
The Church on the Green United Reformed Church is prominent at the west end of the green.

St. Hubert's chapel

St Hubert's chapel or church is in the far north of the civil parish, Idsworth. It was built in 1053 and was originally dedicated to St. Peter and St. Paul. It is a Grade I listed building, listed on 16 March 1954. The chapel contains examples of medieval paintings from around 1300 which include paintings around the altar window of St Peter, St Paul, and two angels. On the north wall there is a painting of St. Hubert and St John the Baptist. The narthex contains an octagonal stone font and above it is a gallery which contains the church organ.

Idsworth, based on its compact late Saxon church, was a chapelry long including Rowland's Castle and until a recent date unknown was dependent on the mother church of Chalton. Hence a dispute concerning the right to appoint the chaplain arose in 1275 between Henry de Bonynges, lord of the manor of Idsworth, who claimed it as an appurtenance, versus the prioress of Nuneaton, who made good (made out better) her right as patron of Chalton church, and therefore of the appendant chapel. The rectors of Chalton were bound from very early times to find a chaplain at the chapel to say mass on Sundays, Wednesdays, and Fridays, and on double feasts throughout the year, and to administer the sacraments and other rites (except the burial of the dead) for the inhabitants of the hamlets of Idsworth "and Dene" (Horndean, or perhaps Finchdean). Sir William Haughe, rector of Chalton, discontinued this practice in 1394 and so proceedings were taken against him in the Court of Arches by Richard Romyn, lord of Idsworth manor, and the rest of the inhabitants of the two villages before Thomas Stowe and Adam Uske, who decided that the rector was liable by custom to find a chaplain to minister in Idsworth Chapel. This "sentence" (ruling) was published by the bishop of Winchester on 1 May 1398, and confirmed by the prior and chapter of Winchester on 3 June.

Sport and leisure
The village has an 18-hole golf course; the club being formed in 1902 with a 9-hole course.

In 1994 Stage 5 of the Tour de France passed through Rowland's Castle, attracting large crowds with its carnival atmosphere.

Notable people
Former Van Morrison guitarist and Britain's Got Talent contestant Herbie Armstrong once ran The Fountain Inn in the centre of the village next to the village green.  His weekly live music evenings attracted music lovers from across the region, and have been known to include some famous faces; Mick Hucknall on one occasion.

Former British No. 1 tennis player Chris Wilkinson remains active in the local, county and national levels.

Gallery

References

External links

 http://www.rowlandscastlepc.org.uk/ – Parish Council website
 http://www.rowlandscastle.com – Rowlands Castle village website and discussion forum
 http://www.rowlandscastleheritagecentre.org.uk/more-about-us/ Rowlands Castle Heritage Centre website

Castles in Hampshire
Villages in Hampshire
Civil parishes in Hampshire
East Hampshire District